Perca may refer to:

 A genus of fish commonly referred to as Perch
 The Italian name for Percha, a town in South Tyrol, Italy
 Perca (Vogošća), a village in Vogošća, near Sarajevo, Bosnia and Herzegovina